Arotinolol (INN, marketed under the tradename Almarl) is a medication in the class of mixed alpha/beta blockers. It also acts as a β3 receptor agonist. A 1979 publication suggests arotinolol as having first been described in the scientific literature by Sumitomo Chemical as "β-adrenergic blocking, antiarrhythmic compound S-596".

Medical uses
It is used in the treatment of high blood pressure and essential tremor. Recommended dosage is 10 to 30 mg per day.

References

External links
  Almarl Full Prescribing Information. Revised November 2009 Sumitomo Dainippon Pharma Co., Ltd.
  Official Sumitomo Dainippon Pharma Website
 

Alpha-1 blockers
Amines
Beta blockers
Beta3-adrenergic agonists
Carboxamides
Secondary alcohols
Tert-butyl compounds
Thiazoles
Thioethers
Thiophenes